Bob Bryan and Mike Bryan were the defending champions, but lost in the final 6–4, 6–4 to tournament winners Simon Aspelin and Todd Perry.

Seeds

Draw

Draw

References
 Main Draw

Regions Morgan Keegan Championships - Doubles
U.S. National Indoor Championships